Willenborg is a German surname. Notable people with the surname include:

 Blaine Willenborg (born 1960), American tennis player
 Frank Willenborg (born 1979), German football referee

German-language surnames